Aashayein Foundation is an NGO (non-governmental organisation) in India that works towards the betterment of the underprivileged children through education. The organization was founded in January 2007 but was formally registered on 19 May 2007 by a group of young IT professionals between the ages of 20 to 30 years. The organization achieves its goals by conducting projects and events aligned with its goals.

Objective and organizational goals 
Aashayein Foundation recognizes the importance of quality education in the growth and development of individuals, country and the world. All the activities of the foundation, are aimed towards the improvement of the standards of education among underprivileged kids.

Although there are many challenges faced by the system of education in India, the foundation has identified three major areas to direct its activities and efforts.

Access to education 

In India, there are a large number of kids who do not attend school. These children are deprived of their basic rights to education. They do not get a chance to get introduced to the education system – that could make a difference in their lives. If this situation continues, these kids would probably grow up being uneducated and would struggle for their livelihoods. Providing these children access to education can turn around their world and create a profound change in their lives. This area is addressed by the Bachhe Mann Ke Sachhe (BMKS) project.

Environment for learning 

The condition of a majority of the schools in India is not in a state that can promise a good learning environment to the children and ensure their overall development. This hampers the overall effectiveness of a school. By improving the infrastructure of schools and enabling them with the basic requirements, the children get a considerably good environment to identify and improve their skills. This area is addressed by the Pustaka Abhiyana (PA) project.

Quality of education 

Quality pertains to the effectiveness of the practices, methods and technologies used to impart education. Quality also depends on the curriculum and its relevance in children's lives. The quality of education (in this context) that the children are provided with is not yet completely effective. This hampers the overall effectiveness of the system of education. With the use of newer methods and technologies, combined with a more relevant curriculum, a major difference is possible in the effectiveness of education on children. This area is addressed by the Shikshana Abhiyana (SA) project.

The organisation aims to replicate these projects and efforts across cities in India and touch the lives of as many children as possible.

Projects

Bacche Mann Ke Sacche (BMKS)

The objective of this project is to identify and create educational opportunities for kids who do not get a chance to attend schools. Through this project children from economically weaker section of the society are identified and supported – giving the child an opportunity to realize its full potential. This project is also aimed to create awareness about education among masses and families who cannot afford education.

BMKS is already in its 3rd year of operations in Bangalore. This project has been launched in Hyderabad in the current financial year 2009–10.

The scope of the project is to:
 Identify children who cannot afford education or are unable to attend school due to multiple reasons.
 Admission of students to government or government aided school in the vicinity.
 Targeting the students in age group 6 to 16 from the standard 1 to 10.
 Taking appropriate actions to ensure continuation of student's education (till 10th Standard).

Shikshana Abhiyana

The objective of this project is to provide quality education to the students in various governments and government aided school. The project aims at bridging the knowledge gap between the public and private schools. One can see the members of Aashayein visiting schools to teach the children and motivate them so that they can take up education in their life. Shikshana Abhiyana is also aimed at building the capacity of the school and school authorities by organizing various teacher training programs, workshops, seminars, etc. for the teachers of government and government aided schools.

The scope of the project is to:
 Work towards reducing the gap between the level of education in public and private schools.
 Function in auxiliary capacity to improve quality of teaching in government schools from standards 1 to 10.
 Ensure all-round development of children with focus on scholastic as well as extra-curricular activities.
 Motivate students, teachers and parents to create a better learning atmosphere.

Pustaka Abhiyana

Most of the underprivileged children cannot afford notebooks and other stationery material. As a result, they have little or no exposure to writing or reading or both. The organization believes this to be one of the major reasons for children unable maintain their interest in classes or practice what is learnt at school, causing in drop-outs. Pustaka Abhiyana is about ensuring that each and every child has access to basic writing material for their education. This project is mainly aimed at rural schools.

The scope of the project is to:
 Identify students who do not have access or have shortage of basic writing material.
 Target the students in age group 6 to 16 from standard 1 to 10.
 Provide basic writing material to such students either individually or by doing basic writing material donation drive in government and semi-government schools.
 Make this a continuous process where Aashayein will provide writing material as and when the students have exhausted their supply.

Breakfast Serving

The Breakfast Serving drive was the organization's first step towards serving underprivileged children in orphanages, mentally challenged places (called 'aashrams'), which was extended to old age homes later. This activity gives the foundation an opportunity to interact with kids and senior citizens. Every Sunday morning, Aashayein members visits an 'aashram' and serves breakfast. The purpose is also to identify the requirements, problems and challenges faced by the authorities who run these 'aashrams' and support them monetarily or non-monetarily.

The scope of the project is to:
 Identify orphanages and old age homes which have monetary constraints.
 Serving breakfast to such orphanages or old age home every Sunday morning.
 Maintain a database of orphanages or old age homes for collaboration to meet their other needs either directly or referring the same to a partner NGO.
 To serve as a platform for new members to be introduced to Aashayein's volunteers and programs and for all volunteers to meet and share their ideas and thoughts to help the organization attain its goals.
 To identify the requirements and challenges faced by the authorities who run these 'aashrams'.

Sponsors and finances 
In Bangalore, Aashayein Foundation is supported by IT giants like Perot Systems, Robert Bosch, Oracle, HP, HCL, Tech Mahindra, Yahoo, Texas Instruments, Zenith, Honeywell, Wipro, SAP.

In Hyderabad, it is supported by Google, Infosys, Wipro, Deloitte, Bank of America, Convergys, and HCL Technologies.

The foundation also works on contributions from more than 1000 individuals.

Achievements 

 150 Aashrams and schools and over 10000 children covered so far and the number is growing.
 Aashayein Foundation conferred the Certificate of Appreciation during the Young Achiever Award 2008 by Rotary Bangalore Midtown and Brigade group.
 Dharmesh Porwal, one of the organization's trustees, was selected for social entrepreneurship workshop at London School of Business
 Ankur Sharma awarded Chhatrapati Shivaji award for his work towards BMKS.
 Anshi Goel awarded "Women who are Catalysts for Social Change" on Women's Day by Infosys, Hyderabad for her work in Aashayein in March 2009. 
 Aashayein Foundation organizes events for the underprivileged students such as summer camps, Republic Day celebrations, Aashayein Walkathon, uniform distributions.

Events 

Aashayein Waves: 
Date: 16 June 2007
Venue: Kanamangala Village, Karnataka 
Target Audience: Students and local villagers
Total number of people who were attended: 250

Independence Day Celebrations: 
Date: 15 August 2007
Venue: Government School, Dairy Colony, Bangalore 
Target Audience: Students and volunteers of Aashayein Foundation
Total number of students who participated: 140

Choti Si Asha
Date: 7 October 2007
Venue: Ganesh Bagh, Bhagwan Mahaveer Jain Road, Bangalore 
Target Audience: 70 kids of BMKS, their parents, 300 students from three orphanages: Sumangali Ashram (RT nagar), Asha deep (Queens Road) and Sneha Nilaya (Lanford gardens)
Total number of students who participated: 600

Children's Day Celebration: 
Date: 17 November 2007
Venue: Cafeteria Oracle Office, Banargatta Main Road, Bangalore 
Target Audience: Students of Government School Dairy Colony and Government School SG Palya
Total number of students who participated: 250 

One year Celebration
Date: 6 January 2008
Venue: Little Sister of the Poor, Hosur Road, Bangalore 
Target Audience: Members of Aashayein Foundation and little helping hands.
Total Number of Members who participated: 60

ART Mela
Date: 2 February 2008
Venue: Sahakari Vidya Kendra, Jayanagar, Bangalore 
Target Audience: Students of Sahakari Vidya Kendra.
Total Number of Students who participated: 300 

Aashayein Weekend Summer Camp
Date: 5 April to 11 May 2008
Venue: Sahakari Vidya Kendra, Jayanagar, Bangalore 
Target Audience: 5th, 6th and 7th Standard Students of Sahakari Vidya Kendra.
Total Number of Students who are participating: 30

Aashayein Weekend Summer Camp, Hyderabad
Date: 20 April to 13 July 2008
Venue: HCHW (Hyderabad Council of Human Welfare) Home, Golconda, Hyderabad 
Target Audience: Residential Children of HCHW Home.
Total Number of Students who participated: 100

Session for Trainers & Volunteers of Aashayein Foundation
Date: 22 June 2008
Venue: HCHW (Hyderabad Council of Human Welfare) Home, Golconda, Hyderabad 
Target Audience: Trainers and volunteers from Aashayein, Hyderabad
Duration: 2 Hrs.

Uniform Distribution to 100 children
Date: 6 July 2008
Venue: HCHW (Hyderabad Council of Human Welfare) Residential Home, Golconda, Hyderabad 
Target Audience: Residential Children of HCHW Home.
Total Number of Students who participated: 100

Aashayein Week at IBS, Hyderabad
Date: 11-15 Aug 2008
Venue: ICFAI Business School, Hyderabad 
Target Audience: B-School students and children
Total Number of Students who participated: 300

INDRADHANUSH '08, Hyderabad
Date: 21 December 2008
Venue: RadhaKrishna Balika Bhavan, Hyderabad 
Target Audience: Children of the Aashram
Total Number of Students who participated: 250

Movie Screening for a Cause '08, Hyderabad
Date: 30 May 2008
Venue: PVR Cinemas Multiplex, Hyderabad 
Target Audience: Children
Total Number of Students who participated: 150

External links

References 

Deccan Post
 http://epaper.deccanpost.in/default.aspx?selPg=24&page=11_07_2008_033.jpg&ed=893&BMode=100&artHigh=11_07_2008_033_001_013

The Hindu 
22 Dec 2008 – http://www.hindu.com/2008/12/22/stories/2008122257890200.htm 
29 Dec 2008 – http://www.hindu.com/2008/12/29/stories/2008122957520200.htm
5 Oct 2007 – http://www.hindu.com/2007/10/05/stories/2007100558930800.htm 
13 Dec 2007 – http://www.hindu.com/2007/12/13/stories/2007121350890200.htm 
16 July 2008 – http://www.hindu.com/2008/07/16/stories/2008071658730200.htm 
21 July 2008 – http://www.hindu.com/2008/07/21/stories/2008072150180200.htm 

The Times of India 
21 Dec 2008 – http://epaper.timesofindia.com/Default/Scripting/ArticleWin.asp?From=Archive&Source=Page&Skin=TOI&BaseHref=TOIH/2008/12/21&PageLabel=6&ForceGif=true&EntityId=Ar00600&ViewMode=HTML&GZ=T 
13 Dec 2007 – http://epaper.timesofindia.com/archive/skins/pastissues2/navigator.asp?login=default 
20 July 2008 – http://epaper.timesofindia.com/archive/skins/pastissues2/navigator.asp?login=default 
21 July 2008 – http://epaper.timesofindia.com/Default/Client.asp?Daily=TOIBG&login=default&Enter=true&Skin=TOI&GZ=T 

Andhra Jyoti 
22 Dec 2008 – http://www.andhrajyothy.com/tabloids/2008/dec/22/hyd/hyd10.pdf 

Sakshi 
22 Dec 2008 – http://epaper.sakshi.com/Details.aspx?id=93169&boxid=28650628 
March 2009 – https://web.archive.org/web/20110708134654/http://channel6magazine.com/article/article.asp?name1=mar09b1.inc&name2=mar09b2.inc&name3=Article 

Deccan Herald 
14 Sep 2007 – https://web.archive.org/web/20080908100844/http://www.deccanherald.com/Content/Sep142007/metro2007091325184.asp 
5 Oct 2007 – https://web.archive.org/web/20080908100844/http://www.deccanherald.com/Content/Sep142007/metro2007091325184.asp 
21 July 2008 – https://web.archive.org/web/20080825023125/http://www.deccanherald.com/CONTENT/Jul212008/city2008072180035.asp

Charities based in India